Everette Howard Hunt Jr. (October 9, 1918 – January 23, 2007) was an American intelligence officer and author. From 1949 to 1970, Hunt served as an officer in the Central Intelligence Agency (CIA), particularly in the United States involvement in regime change in Latin America including the 1954 Guatemalan coup d'état and the 1961 Bay of Pigs invasion. Along with G. Gordon Liddy, Frank Sturgis, and others, Hunt was one of the Nixon administration "plumbers", a team of operatives charged with identifying government sources of national security information "leaks" to outside parties. Hunt and Liddy plotted the Watergate burglaries and other clandestine operations for the Nixon administration. In the ensuing Watergate scandal, Hunt was convicted of burglary, conspiracy, and wiretapping, eventually serving 33 months in prison. After release, Hunt lived in Mexico and then Florida until his death.

Early life

Hunt was born in Hamburg, New York, United States, the son of Ethel Jean (Totterdale) and Everette Howard Hunt Sr., an attorney and Republican Party official. He graduated, along with Howard J. Osborn from Hamburg High School in 1936 and Brown University in 1940. During World War II, Hunt served in the U.S. Navy on the destroyer USS Mayo, the United States Army Air Corps, and finally, the Office of Strategic Services (OSS), the precursor to the CIA, in China.

Career

Author
Hunt was a prolific author, having published 73 books during his lifetime. During and after the war, he wrote several novels under his own name, including East of Farewell (1942), Limit of Darkness (1944), Stranger in Town (1947), Maelstrom (1949)  Bimini Run (1949), and The Violent Ones (1950). He also wrote spy and hardboiled novels under an array of pseudonyms, including Robert Dietrich, Gordon Davis, David St. John, and P. S. Donoghue. Hunt won a Guggenheim Fellowship for his writing in 1946. Some have found parallels between his writings and his experiences during Watergate and espionage. He continued his writing career after he was released from prison, publishing nearly twenty spy thrillers between 1980 and 2000.

Economic Cooperation Administration
Prior to 1949, Hunt served as an Officer in the Information Division of the Economic Cooperation Administration, a predecessor of the Mutual Security Agency.

CIA

Anti-Castro efforts
Shortly following the end of World War II the OSS was disbanded.  The subsequent emergence of the Cold War and the lack of a central intelligence organization resulted in the CIA's formation in 1947. Warner Bros. had just bought rights to Hunt's novel Bimini Run when he joined the CIA's Office of Policy Coordination (OPC) in October 1949. He was assigned as a covert action officer specializing in political action and influence in what later came to be called the CIA's Special Activities Division.

According to David Talbot, "Howard Hunt prided himself on being part of the CIA’s upper tier. But that’s not how he was viewed at the top of the agency. Hunt liked to brag that he had family connections to Wild Bill Donovan himself, who had admitted him into the OSS, the original roundtable of American intelligence. But it turned out that Hunt’s father was a lobbyist in upstate New York to whom Donovan owed a favor, not a fellow Wall Street lawyer. Everyone knew Hunt was a writer, but they also knew he was no Ian Fleming. To the Georgetown set, there would always be something low-rent about men like Hunt—as well as William Harvey and David Morales. The CIA was a cold hierarchy. Men like this would never be invited for lunch with Allen Dulles at the Alibi Club or to play tennis with Dick Helms at the Chevy Chase Club. These men were indispensable—until they became expendable."

Mexico, Guatemala, Japan, Uruguay and Cuba
Hunt became the OPC Station Chief in Mexico City in 1950, and recruited and supervised William F. Buckley Jr., who worked under Hunt in his OPC Station in Mexico during the period 1951–1952. Buckley and Hunt remained lifelong friends, and Buckley became godfather to Hunt's first three children.

In Mexico, Hunt helped lay the framework for Operation PBFortune, later renamed Operation PBSuccess, the successful covert operation to overthrow Jacobo Árbenz, the democratically elected president of Guatemala. Hunt was assigned as Chief of Covert Action in Japan. He afterwards served as Chief of Station in Uruguay, (where he was noted by American diplomatic contemporary Samuel F. Hart for controversial working methods).  Hunt would later say "What we wanted to do was to have a terror campaign, to terrify Arbenz particularly, to terrify his troops, much as the German Stuka bombers terrified the population of Holland, Belgium and Poland”.

Hunt was subsequently given the assignment of forging Cuban exile leaders in the United States into a suitably representative government-in-exile that would, after the Bay of Pigs Invasion, form a pro-American Puppet state intent on taking over Cuba. The failure of the invasion temporarily damaged his career.

Hunt was undeniably bitter about what he perceived as President John F. Kennedy's lack of commitment in attacking and overthrowing the government of Cuba. In his semi-fictional autobiography, Give Us This Day, he wrote: "The Kennedy administration yielded Castro all the excuse he needed to gain a tighter grip on the island of José Martí, then moved shamefacedly into the shadows and hoped the Cuban issue would simply melt away."

Executive Assistant to DCI Allen Dulles
In 1959 Hunt helped CIA Director Allen W. Dulles write The Craft of Intelligence. The following year Hunt established Brigade 2506, an Agency-sponsored group of Cuban exiles formed to attempt the military overthrow of the Cuban government headed by Fidel Castro. It carried out the abortive Bay of Pigs Invasion landings in Cuba on 17 April 1961. After that fiasco, Hunt was reassigned as Executive Assistant to Dulles.

Other work
After President John F. Kennedy fired Dulles in 1961 for the Bay of Pigs failure, Hunt served as the first Chief of Covert Action for the Domestic Operations Division (DODS) from 1962 to 1964.

Hunt told The New York Times in 1974 that he spent about four years working for DODS, beginning shortly after it was set up by the Kennedy administration in 1962, over the "strenuous opposition" of Richard Helms and Thomas H. Karamessines. He said that the division was assembled shortly after the Bay of Pigs operation, and that "many men connected with that failure were shunted into the new domestic unit." He said that some of his projects from 1962 to 1966, which dealt largely with the subsidizing and manipulation of news and publishing organizations in the US, "did seem to violate the intent of the agency's charter."

In 1964, DCI John A. McCone directed Hunt to take a special assignment as a Non-Official Cover (NOC) officer in Madrid, Spain, tasked to create the American answer to Ian Fleming's British MI-6 James Bond novel series.  While assigned in Spain, Hunt was covered as a recently retired U.S. State Department Foreign Service Officer (FSO) who had moved his family to Spain in order to write the first installment of the 9-novel Peter Ward series, On Hazardous Duty (1965).

After a year and a half in Spain, Hunt returned to his assignment at DODS. Following a brief tenure on the Special Activities Staff of the Western European Division, he became Chief of Covert Action for the region (while remaining based in the Washington metropolitan area) in July 1968. Hunt was lauded for his "sagacity, balance and imagination", and received the second-highest rating of Strong (signifying "performance ... characterized by exceptional proficiency") in a performance review from the Division's Chief of Operations in April 1969. However, this was downgraded to the third-highest rating of Adequate in an amendment from the Division's Deputy Chief, who recognized Hunt's "broad experience" but opined that "a series of personal and taxing problems" had "tended to dull his cutting edge." Hunt would later maintain that he "had been stigmatized by the Bay of Pigs", and had come to terms with the fact that he "would not get promoted too much higher."
In these final years of Hunt's CIA service, he began to cultivate new contacts in "society and the business world." While serving as vice president of the Brown University Club of Washington, he befriended and commenced a strong association with the organization's president, former congressional aide Charles Colson, who soon began working on Richard Nixon's presidential campaign. Hunt retired from the CIA at the pay grade of GS-15, Step 8 on April 30, 1970.

Upon retiring from the CIA, Hunt neglected to elect survivorship benefits for his wife. An April 1971 request to retroactively amend his election was rebuffed by the agency. In a May 5, 1972, letter to CIA General Counsel Lawrence Houston, Hunt raised the possibility of returning to active duty for a short period of time in exchange for activating the benefits upon his proposed second retirement. Houston advised Hunt in his May 16 response that this "would be in violation of the spirit of the CIA Retirement Act".

Immediately following his retirement, he went to work for the Robert R. Mullen Company, which cooperated with the CIA; H. R. Haldeman, White House Chief of Staff to President Nixon, wrote in 1978 that the Mullen Company was in fact a CIA front company, a fact that was apparently unknown to Haldeman while he worked in the White House. Through CIA's Project QKENCHANT, Hunt obtained a Covert Security Approval to handle the firm's affairs during Mullen's absence from Washington.

White House service

In 1971, Hunt was hired as a consultant by Colson, by now director of Nixon's Office of Public Liaison, and joined the White House Special Investigations Unit, specializing in political sabotage.

Hunt's first assignment for the White House was a covert operation to break into the Los Angeles office of Daniel Ellsberg's psychiatrist, Lewis J. Fielding. In July 1971, Fielding had refused a request from the Federal Bureau of Investigation for psychiatric data on Ellsberg. Hunt and Liddy cased the building in late August. The burglary, on September 3, 1971, was not detected, but no Ellsberg files were found.

Also in the summer of 1971, Colson authorized Hunt to travel to New England to seek potentially scandalous information on Senator Edward Kennedy, specifically pertaining to the Chappaquiddick incident and to Kennedy's possible extramarital affairs. Hunt sought and used CIA disguises and other equipment for the project. This mission eventually proved unsuccessful, with little if any useful information uncovered by Hunt.

Hunt's White House duties included assassinations-related disinformation. In September 1971, Hunt forged and offered to a Life magazine reporter two top-secret U.S. State Department cables designed to prove that President Kennedy had personally and specifically ordered the assassination of South Vietnam President Ngo Dinh Diem and his brother, Ngô Đình Nhu, during the 1963 South Vietnamese coup. Hunt told the Senate Watergate Committee in 1973 that he had fabricated the cables to show a link between President Kennedy and the assassination of Diem, a Catholic, to estrange Catholic voters from the Democratic Party, after Colson suggested he "might be able to improve upon the record."

In 1972, Hunt and Liddy were part of an assassination plot targeting journalist Jack Anderson, on orders from Colson. Nixon had disliked Anderson because during the 1960 presidential election Anderson had published an election-eve story concerning a secret loan from Howard Hughes to Nixon's brother, which Nixon believed was the reason he lost the election. Hunt and Liddy met with a CIA operative and discussed methods of assassinating Anderson, which included covering Anderson's car steering wheel with LSD to drug him and cause a fatal accident, poisoning his aspirin bottle, and staging a fatal robbery. The assassination plot never materialized because Hunt and Liddy were arrested for their involvement in the Watergate scandal later that year.

Watergate scandal

According to Seymour Hersh, writing in The New Yorker, Nixon White House tapes show that after presidential candidate George Wallace was shot on May 15, 1972, Nixon and Colson agreed to send Hunt to the Milwaukee home of the gunman, Arthur Bremer, to place McGovern presidential campaign material there. The intention was to link Bremer with the Democrats. Hersh writes that, in a taped conversation, "Nixon is energized and excited by what seems to be the ultimate political dirty trick: the FBI and the Milwaukee police will be convinced, and will tell the world, that the attempted assassination of Wallace had its roots in left-wing Democratic politics." Hunt did not make the trip, however, because the FBI had moved too quickly to seal Bremer's apartment and place it under police guard.

Hunt organized the bugging of the Democratic National Committee at the Watergate office building.  Hunt and fellow operative G. Gordon Liddy, along with the five burglars arrested at the Watergate, were indicted on federal charges three months later.

Hunt put pressure on the White House and the Committee to Re-Elect the President for cash payments to cover legal fees, family support, and expenses, for himself and his fellow burglars. Key Nixon figures, including Haldeman, Charles Colson, Herbert W. Kalmbach, John Mitchell, Fred LaRue, and John Dean eventually became entangled in the payoff schemes, and large amounts of money were passed to Hunt and his accomplices, to try to ensure their silence at the trial, by pleading guilty to avoid prosecutors' questions, and afterwards. Tenacious media, including The Washington Post and The New York Times, eventually used investigative journalism to break open the payoff scheme, and published many articles that proved to be the beginning of the end for the cover-up. Prosecutors had to follow up once the media reported. Hunt also pressured Colson, Dean, and John Ehrlichman to ask Nixon for clemency in sentencing, and eventual presidential pardons for himself and his cronies; this eventually helped to implicate and snare those higher up.

Hunt was sentenced to 30 months to 8 years in prison, and spent 33 months in prison at Federal Correctional Complex, Allenwood and the low-security Federal Prison Camp at Eglin Air Force Base, Florida, on a conspiracy charge, arriving at the latter institution on April 25, 1975. While at Allenwood, he suffered a mild stroke.

JFK conspiracy allegations
Hunt supported the Warren Commission's conclusion that Lee Harvey Oswald acted alone in the assassination of John F. Kennedy.

Early allegations: Hunt as one of the "three tramps"

 The Dallas Morning News, the Dallas Times Herald, and the Fort Worth Star-Telegram photographed three transients under police escort near the Texas School Book Depository shortly after the assassination of Kennedy. The men later became known as the "three tramps". According to Vincent Bugliosi, allegations that these men were involved in a conspiracy originated from theorist Richard E. Sprague who compiled the photographs in 1966 and 1967, and subsequently turned them over to Jim Garrison during his investigation of Clay Shaw. Appearing before a nationwide audience on the December 31, 1968, episode of The Tonight Show, Garrison held up a photo of the three and suggested they were involved in the assassination. Later, in 1974, assassination researchers Alan J. Weberman and Michael Canfield compared photographs of the men to people they believed to be suspects involved in a conspiracy and said that two of the men were Watergate burglars E. Howard Hunt and Frank Sturgis. Comedian and civil rights activist Dick Gregory helped bring national media attention to the allegations against Hunt and Sturgis in 1975 after obtaining the comparison photographs from Weberman and Canfield. Immediately after obtaining the photographs, Gregory held a press conference that received considerable coverage and his charges were reported in Rolling Stone and Newsweek.

The Rockefeller Commission reported in 1975 that they investigated the allegation that Hunt and Sturgis, on behalf of the CIA, participated in the assassination of Kennedy. The final report of that commission stated that witnesses who testified that the "derelicts" bore a resemblance to Hunt or Sturgis "were not shown to have any qualifications in photo identification beyond that possessed by an average layman". Their report also stated that FBI Agent Lyndal L. Shaneyfelt, "a nationally-recognized expert in photoidentification and photoanalysis" with the FBI photographic laboratory, had concluded from photo comparison that none of the men was Hunt or Sturgis. In 1979, the United States House Select Committee on Assassinations reported that forensic anthropologists had again analyzed and compared the photographs of the "tramps" with those of Hunt and Sturgis, as well as with photographs of Thomas Vallee, Daniel Carswell, and Fred Lee Chrisman. According to the Committee, only Chrisman resembled any of the tramps, but determined that he was not in Dealey Plaza on the day of the assassination.

In 1992, journalist Mary La Fontaine discovered the November 22, 1963, arrest records that the Dallas Police Department had released in 1989, which named the three men as Gus W. Abrams, Harold Doyle, and John F. Gedney. According to the arrest reports, the three men were "taken off a boxcar in the railroad yards right after President Kennedy was shot", detained as "investigative prisoners", described as unemployed and passing through Dallas, then released four days later.

Compulsive Spy and Coup d'Etat in America
In 1973, Viking Press published Tad Szulc's book about Hunt's career titled Compulsive Spy. Szulc, a former correspondent for The New York Times, claimed unnamed CIA sources told him that Hunt, working with Rolando Cubela Secades, had a role in coordinating the assassination of Castro for an aborted second invasion of Cuba. In one passage, he also stated that Hunt was the acting chief of the CIA station in Mexico City in 1963 while Lee Harvey Oswald was there.

The Rockefeller Commission's June 1975 report stated that they investigated allegations that the CIA, including Hunt, may have had contact with Oswald or Jack Ruby. According to the Commission, one "witness testified that E. Howard Hunt was Acting Chief of a CIA Station in Mexico City in 1963, implying that he could have had contact with Oswald when Oswald visited Mexico City in September 1963." Their report stated that there was "no credible evidence" of CIA involvement in the assassination and noted: "At no time was [Hunt] ever the Chief, or Acting Chief, of a CIA Station in Mexico City.

Released in the Fall of 1975 after the Rockefeller Commission's report, Weberman and Canfield's book Coup d'Etat in America reiterated Szulc's allegation. In July 1976, Hunt filed a $2.5 million libel suit against the authors, as well as the book's publishers and editor. According to Ellis Rubin, Hunt's attorney who filed the suit in a Miami federal court, the book said that Hunt took part in the assassination of Kennedy and Martin Luther King Jr.

As part of his suit, Hunt filed a legal action in the United States District Court for the Eastern District of Virginia in September 1978 requesting that Szulc be cited for contempt if he refused to divulge his sources. Three months earlier, Szulc stated in a deposition that he refused to name his sources due to "the professional confidentiality of sources" and "journalistic privilege". Rubin stated that knowing the source of the allegation that Hunt was in Mexico City in 1963 was important because Szulc's passage "is what everybody uses as an authority ... he's cited in everything written on E. Howard Hunt". He added that rumors that Hunt was involved in the Kennedy assassination might be put to end if Szulc's source was revealed. Stating that Hunt had not provided a sufficient reason to override Szulc's First Amendment rights to protect the confidentiality of his sources, United States District Judge Albert Vickers Bryan Jr. ruled in favor of Szulc.

Libel suit: Liberty Lobby and The Spotlight
On November 3, 1978, Hunt gave a security-classified deposition for the House Select Committee on Assassinations. He denied knowledge of any conspiracy to kill Kennedy. (The Assassination Records Review Board (ARRB) released the deposition in February 1996.) Two newspaper articles published a few months before the deposition stated that a 1966 CIA memo linking Hunt to the assassination of President Kennedy had recently been provided to the HSCA. The first article, by Victor Marchetti – author of the book The CIA and the Cult of Intelligence (1974) – appeared in the Liberty Lobby newspaper The Spotlight on August 14, 1978. According to Marchetti, the memo said in essence, "Some day we will have to explain Hunt's presence in Dallas on November 22, 1963." He also wrote that Hunt, Frank Sturgis, and Gerry Patrick Hemming would soon be implicated in a conspiracy to kill John F. Kennedy.

The second article, by Joseph J. Trento and Jacquie Powers, appeared six days later in the Sunday edition of The News Journal, Wilmington, Delaware. It alleged that the purported memo was initialed by Richard Helms and James Angleton and showed that, shortly after Helms and Angleton were elevated to their highest positions in the CIA, they discussed the fact that Hunt had been in Dallas on the day of the assassination and that his presence there had to be kept secret. However, nobody has been able to produce this supposed memo, and the United States President's Commission on CIA Activities within the United States determined that Hunt had been in Washington, D.C., on the day of the assassination.

Hunt sued Liberty Lobby – but not the Sunday News Journal – for libel. Liberty Lobby stipulated, in this first trial, that the question of Hunt's alleged involvement in the assassination would not be contested. Hunt prevailed and was awarded $650,000 damages. In 1983, however, the case was overturned on appeal because of error in jury instructions. In a second trial, held in 1985, Mark Lane made an issue of Hunt's location on the day of the Kennedy assassination. Lane successfully defended Liberty Lobby by producing evidence suggesting that Hunt had been in Dallas. He used depositions from David Atlee Phillips, Richard Helms, G. Gordon Liddy, Stansfield Turner, and Marita Lorenz, plus a cross-examination of Hunt. On retrial, the jury rendered a verdict for Liberty Lobby. Lane claimed he convinced the jury that Hunt was a JFK assassination conspirator, but some of the jurors who were interviewed by the media said they disregarded the conspiracy theory and judged the case (according to the judge's jury instructions) on whether the article was published with "reckless disregard for the truth." Lane outlined his theory about Hunt's and the CIA's role in Kennedy's murder in a 1991 book, Plausible Denial.

Mitrokhin Archive

Former KGB archivist Vasili Mitrokhin indicated in 1999 that Hunt was made part of a fabricated conspiracy theory disseminated by a Soviet "active measures" program designed to discredit the CIA and the United States. According to Mitrokhin, the KGB created a forged letter from Oswald to Hunt implying that the two were linked as conspirators, then forwarded copies of it to "three of the most active conspiracy buffs" in 1975. Mitrokhin indicated that the photocopies were accompanied by a fake cover letter from an anonymous source alleging that the original had been given to FBI Director Clarence M. Kelley and was apparently being suppressed.

Kerry Thornley's Memoir 
According to Kerry Thornley, who served with Oswald in the Marine Corps and wrote the biographical book The Idle Warriors about him before the assassination of the president (the manuscript was seized during the investigation and was kept as physical evidence for a long time), Thornley regularly met with a man in New Orleans known to him as Gary Kirstein, with whom they discussed the assassination of John F. Kennedy. Also, according to Thornley, Kirstein in those years wanted to organize the assassination of Martin Luther King Jr. and planned to "frame a jailbird for it." In "Confession to Conspiracy to Assassinate JFK by Kerry Thornley as told to Sondra London" he said that after Watergate, when photos of Howard Hunt appeared in the media, he found that he was very similar to his acquaintance Kirstein, along with whom they discussed organizing the assassination of the president.

"Deathbed confession" of involvement in Kennedy assassination 
After Hunt's death, Howard St. John Hunt and David Hunt stated that their father had recorded several claims about himself and others being involved in a conspiracy to assassinate President John F. Kennedy. Notes and audio recordings were made. In the April 5, 2007, issue of Rolling Stone, St. John Hunt detailed a number of individuals purported to be implicated by his father, including Lyndon B. Johnson, Cord Meyer, David Atlee Phillips, Frank Sturgis, David Morales, Antonio Veciana, William Harvey, and an assassin he termed "French gunman grassy knoll" who many presume is Lucien Sarti.  The two sons alleged that their father cut the information from his memoirs to avoid possible perjury charges. According to Hunt's widow and other children, the two sons took advantage of Hunt's loss of lucidity by coaching and exploiting him for financial gain and furthermore falsified accounts of Hunt's supposed confession. The Los Angeles Times said they examined the materials offered by the sons to support the story and found them to be "inconclusive".

Memoir: American Spy: My Secret History in the CIA, Watergate, and Beyond
Hunt's memoir, American Spy: My Secret History in the CIA, Watergate, and Beyond, was ghost-written by Greg Aunapu and published by John Wiley & Sons in March 2007. According to the Hunt Literary Estate, Hunt had intended to write an update to his 1974 autobiography Undercover and supplement this edition with post-9/11 reflections, but by the time he had embarked on the project, he was too ill to continue.  This prompted John Wiley & Sons to search for and hire a ghost writer to write the book in its entirety.  According to St. John Hunt, it was he who suggested to his father the idea of a memoir to reveal what he knew about the Kennedy assassination, but the Hunt Literary Estate refutes this as scurrilous.

The foreword to American Spy was written by William F. Buckley Jr. According to Buckley, he was asked through an intermediary to write the introduction but declined after he found that the manuscript contained material "that suggested transgressions of the highest order, including a hint that LBJ might have had a hand in the plot to assassinate President Kennedy." He stated that the work "was clearly ghostwritten", and eventually agreed to write an introduction focusing on his early friendship with Hunt after he received a revised manuscript "with the loony grassy-knoll bits chiseled out".

Publishers Weekly called American Spy a "breezy, unrepentant memoir" and described it as a "nostalgic memoir [that] breaks scant new ground in an already crowded field". Tim Rutten of the Los Angeles Times said it was "a bitter and self-pitying memoir" and "offers a rather standard account of how men of his generation became involved in intelligence work".  Referencing the book's title, Tim Weiner of The New York Times wrote: "American Spy is presented as a 'secret history,' a double-barreled misrepresentation. There are no real secrets in this book. As history it is bunk." Weiner said that the author's examination of the Kennedy assassination was the low-point of the book, indicating that Hunt pretended to take various conspiracy theories, including the involvement of former President Johnson, seriously. He concluded his review describing it as a work "in a long tradition of arrant nonsense" and "a book to shun". Joseph C. Goulden of The Washington Times described it as a "true mess of a book" and dismissed Hunt's allegations against Johnson as "fantasy". Goulden summarized his review: "I wish now that I had not read this pathetic book. Avoid it."

Writing for The Christian Science Monitor, Daniel Schorr said "Hunt tells most of his Watergate venture fairly straight". Contrasting this opinion, Politico's James Rosen described the chapters regarding Watergate as the "[m]ost problematic" and wrote: "There are numerous factual errors – misspelled names, wrong dates, phantom participants in meetings, fictitious orders given – and the authors never substantively address, only pause occasionally to demean, the vast scholarly literature that has arisen in the last two decades to explain the central mystery of Watergate." Rosen's review was not entirely negative and he indicated that the book "succeeds in taking readers beyond the caricatures and conspiracy theories to preserve the valuable memory of Hunt as he really was: passionate patriot; committed Cold Warrior; a lover of fine food, wine and women; incurable intriguer, wicked wit and superb storyteller." Dennis Lythgoe of Deseret News said "[t]he writing style is awkward and often embarrassing", but that "the book as a whole is a fascinating look into the mind of one of the major Watergate figures". In National Review, Mark Riebling praised American Spy as "the only autobiography I know of that convincingly conveys what it was like to be an American spy." The Boston Globe writer Martin Nolan called it "admirable and important" and said that Hunt "presents a livelier, tabloid version of the 1970s". According to Nolan: "It is the best moment-by-moment depiction of the June 17, 1972, burglary of Democratic National Committee headquarters I have ever read."

Personal life and death 
	
Hunt's first wife, Dorothy, was killed in the December 8, 1972, plane crash of United Airlines Flight 553 in Chicago. Congress, the Federal Bureau of Investigation (FBI), and the National Transportation Safety Board (NTSB) investigated the crash, and concluded that the crash was an accident caused by crew error. Over $10,000 in cash was found in Dorothy Hunt's handbag in the wreckage.

Hunt later married schoolteacher Laura Martin, with whom he raised two more children, Austin and Hollis. Following his release from prison, he and Laura moved to Guadalajara, Mexico, where they lived for five years. Afterwards they returned to the United States, where they settled in Miami, Florida.

On January 23, 2007, he died of pneumonia in Miami. He is buried in Prospect Lawn Cemetery in his hometown of Hamburg, New York.

In the media
A fictionalized account of Hunt's role in the Bay of Pigs operation appears in Norman Mailer's 1991 novel Harlot's Ghost. Hunt was portrayed by Ed Harris in the 1995 biopic Nixon. In the 2019 film The Irishman, Hunt is portrayed by stage actor Daniel Jenkins. In the 2022 series Gaslit, Hunt is portrayed by J. C. MacKenzie. Canadian journalist David Giammarco interviewed Hunt for the December 2000 issue of Cigar Aficionado magazine. Hunt later wrote the foreword to Giammarco's book For Your Eyes Only: Behind the Scenes of the James Bond Films (ECW Press, 2002).

An episode of The X-Files, entitled Musings of a Cigarette Smoking Man, depicted the shadowy intelligence operative played by William B. Davis as an unsuccessful author of mystery/suspense fiction in his spare time. When meeting Lee Harvey Oswald, prior to the JFK assassination, he goes by the alias 'Mr. Hunt.'

In the 2023 HBO miniseries White House Plumbers, Hunt is played by Woody Harrelson.

Books

Nonfiction
 Give Us This Day: The Inside Story of the CIA and the Bay of Pigs Invasion, by One of Its Key Organizers. New Rochelle: Arlington House (1973).
 Undercover: Memoirs of an American Secret Agent (1974). New York: Berkeley Publishing Corporation.
 American Spy: My Secret History in the CIA, Watergate, and Beyond (2007), with Greg Aunapu. Foreword by William F. Buckley, Jr. Hoboken, N.J.: John Wiley & Sons.

Book contributions
 Foreword to For Your Eyes Only: Behind the Scenes of the James Bond Films, by David Giammarco (2002)

Novels as Howard Hunt or E. Howard Hunt
 East of Farewell (1942)
 Limit of Darkness (1944)
 Stranger in Town (1947)
 Calculated Risk: A Play (as Howard Hunt) (1948)
 Maelstrom  (as Howard Hunt). (1948)
 Bimini Run (1949)
 The Violent Ones (1950)
 The Berlin Ending: A Novel of Discovery (1973)
 Hargrave Deception / E. Howard Hunt (1980)
 Gaza Intercept / E. Howard Hunt (1981)
 Cozumel / E. Howard Hunt (1985)
 Kremlin Conspiracy / E. Howard Hunt (1985)
 Guadalajara / E. Howard Hunt (1990)
 Murder in State / E. Howard Hunt (1990)
 Body Count / E. Howard Hunt (1992)
 Chinese Red / by E. Howard Hunt (1992)
 Mazatlán / E. Howard Hunt (1993) (lists former pseudonym P. S. Donoghue on cover)
 Ixtapa / E. Howard Hunt (1994)
 Islamorada / E. Howard Hunt (1995)
 Paris Edge / E. Howard Hunt (1995)
 Izmir / E. Howard Hunt (1996)
 Dragon Teeth: A Novel / by E. Howard Hunt (1997)
 Guilty Knowledge / E. Howard Hunt (1999)
 Sonora / E. Howard Hunt (2000)

As Robert Dietrich
Cheat (1954)
One for the Road (1954)
Be My Victim (1956)
Murder on the rocks: an original novel (1957)
House on Q Street (1959)
Murder on Her Mind (1960)
End of a Stripper (1960)
Mistress to Murder (1960)
Calypso Caper (1961)
Angel Eyes (1961)
Curtains for a Lover (1962)
My Body (1962)

As P. S. Donoghue
Dublin Affair (1988)
Sarkov Confession: a novel (1989)
Evil Time (1992)

As David St. John
Festival for Spies
The Towers of Silence
Return from Vorkuta (1965)
The Venus Probe (1966)
On Hazardous Duty (1966)
One of Our Agents is Missing (1967) 
Mongol Mask (1968)
Sorcerers (1969)
Diabolus (1971)
Coven (1972)

As Gordon Davis
I Came to Kill (1953)
House Dick (1961)
Counterfeit Kill (1963)
Ring Around Rosy (1964)
Where Murder Waits (1965)

As John Baxter
 A Foreign Affair. New York: Avon (1954)
 Unfaithful. New York: Avon (1955)

Notes

See also

 G. Gordon Liddy
James W. McCord
 All the President's Men by Carl Bernstein and Bob Woodward

References

Bibliography
 Szulc, Tad (1973). Compulsive Spy: The Strange Career of E. Howard Hunt. New York: Viking Press. .

Further reading
 Staff writer (May 20, 1974). "The Spy Whom Nixon Feared." People Weekly.

External links
 
 E. Howard Hunt collection in the Harold Weisberg Archive at Internet Archive
 Everette Hunt records at FBI Records: The Vault
 Interview with Slate
 "Howard Hunt's Final Mission." Review of American Spy by James Rosen in The Politico (February 7, 2007)
"The Art and Arts of E. Howard Hunt." 1973 review by Gore Vidal in The New York Review of Books
"Literary Agent." Review essay by Rachel Donadio in the New York Times Sunday Book Review (February 18, 2007)
Obituary and bibliography of Hunt's novels
Deposition for the House Select Committee on Assassinations (1978). Released in 1996.

1918 births
2007 deaths
20th-century American male writers
20th-century American novelists
American male novelists
American people convicted of burglary
American spies
American spy fiction writers
Brown University alumni
Cold War spies
Florida Republicans
Members of the Committee for the Re-Election of the President
Military personnel from New York (state)
People associated with the assassination of John F. Kennedy
People convicted in the Watergate scandal
People from Hamburg, New York
People of the Central Intelligence Agency
People of the Office of Strategic Services
United States Army Air Forces personnel of World War II
United States Army Air Forces soldiers
Watergate Seven
World War II spies for the United States
Writers from Buffalo, New York